Der Wahrheitsfreund or Der Wahrheits-Freund (“The Friend of Truth”) was the first German language Catholic newspaper in the United States and one of many German-language newspapers in Cincinnati, Ohio during the nineteenth century. It was published by the Roman Catholic Archdiocese of Cincinnati, and proceeds went to the St. Aloysius Orphan Society.

History
At the time of the paper's first issue on July 20, 1837, the Diocese of Cincinnati covered the entirety of Ohio and its English-language weekly, The Catholic Telegraph, had circulated for several years. The Wahrheitsfreund’s founder, vicar general John Henni, served as editor from its founding to his appointment as the first Bishop of Milwaukee in 1843. By 1875, the paper had 14,400 subscribers. In 1907, the Wahrheitsfreund merged with Rev. Joseph Jessing's Ohio Waisenfreund (Ohio Orphan's Friend).

Notable people

Editors
Most Rev. John Henni editor/publisher from 1837–1843
John James Maximilian Oertel editor from 1844–1846
 Hermann Lehmann publisher from 1846–1850
Joseph A. Hemann publisher from September 1850 to December 1865
H. Baumstark (c. 1877)

Writers
Rev. Francis Xavier Pierz (1854–after 1862) – missionary to the Ottawa and Ojibwa

See also
Cincinnati Volksfreund
Cincinnati Volksblatt
Hochwächter, a Cincinnati newspaper critical of the Catholic church
Cincinnatier Freie Presse

References

Publications established in 1837
Publications disestablished in 1907
Roman Catholic Archdiocese of Cincinnati
Catholic newspapers published in the United States
Defunct weekly newspapers
Weekly newspapers published in the United States
Defunct newspapers published in Cincinnati
German-American culture in Cincinnati
German-language newspapers published in Ohio